The Pied Piper of Hamelin (German: Der Rattenfänger von Hameln) is a 1918 German silent drama film directed by and starring Paul Wegener and also featuring Lyda Salmonova and Wilhelm Diegelmann. It is based on the legendary story of the Pied Piper of Hamelin.

It was shot at the Tempelhof Studios and on location around Bautzen and Hildesheim. The film's sets were designed by the art director Rochus Gliese. The animator Lotte Reiniger worked on the design of the film's intertitles.

It premièred at the Union-Theater am Nollendorfplatz on 19 December 1918.

Cast
Paul Wegener as Fremder Spielmann 
Lyda Salmonova as Ursula 
Clemens Kaufung as Schinderknecht 
Wilhelm Diegelmann as mayor
Frida Richard
Elsa Wagner as Weib des Bürgermeister 
Armin Schweizer as Magerer Ratsherr 
Jakob Tiedtke as Ratsapotheker 
Märte Rassow as Märte 
Hans Stürm as Henker

References

External links

Films of the Weimar Republic
German silent feature films
Films directed by Paul Wegener
German drama films
1918 drama films
UFA GmbH films
Films shot at Tempelhof Studios
Films set in the Middle Ages
Films based on Pied Piper of Hamelin
Films set in the Holy Roman Empire
German black-and-white films
Films based on fairy tales
Silent drama films
1910s German films
1910s German-language films